Martin Beaver (born November 10, 1967) is a Canadian violinist best known as first violinist of the Tokyo String Quartet. Beaver joined the Tokyo String Quartet as its first violinist in 2002 and remained until they disbanded in 2013.  As a part of the Tokyo String Quartet, he played the Paganini-Comte Cozio di Salabue violin (circa 1727) on loan from the Nippon Foundation, part of the Paganini Quartet collection of instruments made by Antonio Stradivari.  He currently performs on a violin made by the luthier Nicolò Bergonzi.  Now on faculty at the Colburn School in Los Angeles, he remains active in both chamber music and as a soloist, and established the Montrose Trio with pianist Jon Kimura Parker and cellist Clive Greensmith.

Early life
Martin Beaver was born in Winnipeg, and raised in Hamilton, Canada.  His early violin teachers include Claude Letourneau and Carlisle Wilson.  Subsequently, he studied violin with Victor Danchenko at the Royal Conservatory of Music, Henryk Szeryng at the Conservatoire de Musique de Geneve, and Josef Gingold at Indiana University. He also played with the Hamilton Philharmonic Youth Orchestra for many years.

Awards
Sanford Medal from Yale University 2013
Canada Council's Virginia P. Moore Award for most promising young Canadian classical artist in 1993
Top prizes at the 1990 International Violin Competition of Indianapolis, the 1991 Montreal International Music Competition, and 1993 Queen Elizabeth Competition in Belgium

Teaching
Beaver has taught at The Royal Conservatory of Music, the University of British Columbia, Hillfield Strathallan College the Peabody Conservatory of Music of Johns Hopkins University, the Steinhardt School of New York University, and has been the Artist in Residence at the Yale School of Music. During the fall of 2013, Beaver joined the faculty at The Colburn School as co-director of the String Chamber Music Studies Program and Professor of violin.

Recordings
Beaver has recorded for the Rene Gailly, Naim Audio, NAXOS and both of Canadian Broadcast Corporation’s Record labels. With the Tokyo String Quartet, he recorded with Harmonia Mundi.

References

External links
 Martin Beaver at The Canadian Encyclopedia
 Andrew Kwan Artist Management Bio
 Tokyo Quartet Bio

Canadian classical violinists
Male classical violinists
1967 births
Living people
The Royal Conservatory of Music alumni
Yale School of Music faculty
Academic staff of The Royal Conservatory of Music
Prize-winners of the Queen Elisabeth Competition
21st-century classical violinists
21st-century Canadian male musicians
21st-century Canadian violinists and fiddlers
Canadian male violinists and fiddlers